Joseba Albizu Lizaso (born 6 July 1978 in Azpeitia, Basque Country) is a Spanish former professional road bicycle racer, who rode professionally between 2003 and 2006 for the  and  teams. Albizu won the Giro del Friuli in 2003.

Major results

2002
 2nd Overall Giro Ciclistico d'Italia
2003
 1st Overall Giro del Friuli
 2nd Gran Premio Nobili Rubinetterie
 7th GP Ouest–France
2005
 1st Mountains classification Euskal Bizikleta
 7th Subida a Urkiola
 9th Gran Premio de Llodio

External links 
Team Profile 
Eurosport Profile

Palmarès

1978 births
Living people
People from Azpeitia
Cyclists from the Basque Country (autonomous community)
Spanish male cyclists
Sportspeople from Gipuzkoa